Huayou Cobalt Co., Ltd is primarily a supplier of cobalt, including cobalt tetroxide, cobalt oxide, cobalt carbonate, cobalt hydroxide, cobalt oxalate, cobalt sulfate, and cobalt monoxide. It is headquartered in the Tongxiang Economic Development Zone of Zhejiang, China.

Child labor allegations and Huayou's actions to take responsibilities
According to a joint Amnesty International and African Resources Watch report, Congo DongFang International Mining, a subsidiary of Huayou Cobalt, sources cobalt from primitive "artisanal" mines in the Democratic Republic of the Congo, where there are few worker protections and child labor has been employed. Apple Inc. said that approximately 20% of the cobalt in Apple's batteries were sourced from Huayou Cobalt.

In response, Huayou Cobalt admits to having "insufficient awareness of supply chain management", and did not know that buying artisanal cobalt would increase child labor.

In 2016, Apple said that starting in 2017, they will treat cobalt as a conflict mineral, and require all cobalt suppliers to agree to outside supply-chain audits and risk assessments. After a 2017 Sky News follow-up that showed that child labor continued to be utilized, Apple said it stopped buying cobalt mined by hand in DRC entirely.

In June 2018, Signify, together with Fairphone and Huayou Cobalt co-founded the Fair Cobalt Alliance, the members include :LGES、Tesla、Google、Britishvolt、ATL,FREYR.

(01-16-2019) Ford (NYSE:F) initiated the project with IBM (NYSE:IBM), LG Chem (OTCPK:LGCLF) and China's Huayou Cobalt to ensure the mineral used in lithium-ion batteries has not been mined by children or used to fuel conflict. The typical electric car battery requires up to 20 pounds of cobalt, and by 2026, demand for cobalt is expected to multiply eightfold.

See also
 List of companies of China

References

External links

2002 establishments in China
Companies established in 2002